The 1947 Colgate Red Raiders football team was an American football team represented the Colgate University as an independent during the 1947 college football season.  In its first season under head coach Paul Bixler, the team compiled a 1–5–2 record and was outscored by a total of 139 to 87. The team played its home games at Colgate Athletic Field in Hamilton, New York.

Schedule

References

Colgate
Colgate Raiders football seasons
Colgate Red Raiders football